The Post Has Gone is a 1962 West German musical comedy film directed by Helmuth M. Backhaus and starring Vivi Bach, Adrian Hoven, and Claus Biederstaedt.

The film's sets were designed by the art directors Mirko Lipuzic and Johannes Ott. The film was shot on location in Yugoslavia. The plot centers on a trip to the Adriatic Sea by a group of competition winners.

Cast
 Vivi Bach as Barbi Lothar
 Adrian Hoven as Willy
 Claus Biederstaedt as Harry Eberhardt
 Corny Collins as Gina
 Elma Karlowa as Wilma
 Heinz Erhardt as Walter Eberhardt
 Wolf Albach-Retty as Lukas Lenz
 Gerhard Wendland as Rudolf Lothar
 Margitta Scherr as Anja Stolze
 Gunnar Möller as Franz
 Ilse Steppat as Elfriede Stolze
 Kurt Großkurth as Teutobald Stolze
 Dagmar Hank as Petra Lenz
 Chris Howland as John
 Peter Fröhlich as Till Hartmann
 Ralf Wolter as Herr Ratsam
 Beppo Brem as Sepp

References

Further reading
 Bock, Hans-Michael & Bergfelder, Tim. The Concise CineGraph. Encyclopedia of German Cinema. Berghahn Books, 2009.

External links 
 

1962 films
1962 musical comedy films
German musical comedy films
West German films
1960s German-language films
Films directed by Helmuth M. Backhaus
Gloria Film films
1960s German films